These are the filmographies for the cartoon shorts series created by American animation producer Fred Seibert at and the animation production company he founded, Frederator Studios. His previous shorts series –What A Cartoon!– was produced while he was president at Hanna-Barbera.

Oh Yeah! Cartoons shorts [1998-2001]
Oh Yeah! Cartoons was Fred Seibert's second cartoon incubator and Frederator Studios' first production, with 99 original shorts exhibited on Nickelodeon. The shorts are listed in the order that they originally aired.

The series spin-offs were The Fairly OddParents, ChalkZone, and My Life as a Teenage Robot.

Random! Cartoons [2008–2009]
The original 39 Random! Cartoons shorts were supervised by series creator Fred Seibert and produced by Eric Homan and Kevin Kolde as Frederator Studios's third cartoon incubator. Exhibited on Nickelodeon. The shorts are listed in the order that they originally aired.

Spin-off series were Adventure Time, Fanboy & Chum Chum, and Bravest Warriors.

The Meth Minute 39 [2007–2008]
The Meth Minute 39 had 39 original short cartoons and one bonus short, and was Frederator's fourth cartoon incubator. Production supervision was by series creator Fred Seibert, all individual cartoons were created by Dan Meth and produced by Carrie Miller, for exhibition on Channel Frederator. The shorts are listed in the order that they originally aired.

The spin-off series was "Nite Fite."

List of episodes

Too Cool! Cartoons [2013–2014]
There were 11 Too Cool! Cartoons, Frederator Studios' fifth cartoon incubator, produced by Eric Homan and Kevin Kolde at Frederator Studios in Burbank. Exhibited at Cartoon Hangover. The shorts are listed in the order that they originally aired.

Spin-off series were Bee & PuppyCat  and DeadEndia.

GO! Cartoons [2017–2018]
GO! Cartoons was Fred Seibert's sixth shorts creator and Frederator Studios' fifth, produced by Eric Homan and Kevin Kolde, in conjunction with Sony Pictures Animation. It will be Frederator's last incubator since Seibert resigned from Frederator and started FredFilms in February 2021. All 12 shorts were exhibited at Cartoon Hangover and Cartoon Hangover Select  on Ellation's VRV subscription platform. The shorts are listed in the order that they originally aired.

No series spin-off series have been announced as of 2018.

Frederator Digital's Mini-Series [2018]
Frederator Digital's Mini-Series are produced by Carrie Miller (executive produced by Fred Seibert) and exhibited on Cartoon Hangover Select on the VRV subscription platform.

See also 
Fred Seibert cartoon shorts filmography
List of Nickelodeon Animation Studio productions
List of Cartoon Network Studios productions

References

Filmographies
Frederator Studios
Lists of animated cartoons